Jari Mäkinen (born 13 June 1990) is a Finnish former motorcycle speedway rider.

Career
Born in Hämeenkyrö, Mäkinen took up speedway at the age of eight. He has ridden for several teams in Sweden (including current team Rospiggarna), Poland, and Denmark, and in the UK for Mildenhall Fen Tigers in 2008 and in the Premier League for Somerset Rebels in 2009. In November 2011 he signed with Leicester Lions for the 2012 Premier League season. He joined Ipswich Witches in 2013 but was dropped early in the season.

Mäkinen won the Finnish Under-21 Championship in 2007.

In 2014 Makinen decided to sit out the UK season and concentrate on his racing commitments in Sweden and his native Finland which proved to be the right decision as his reduced schedule helped him become the national champion of Finland after winning the Finnish Individual Speedway Championship in 2014.

In 2015 Makinen again rode only in Sweden and Finland while trying to secure a reserve berth in the F.I.M Finnish Grand Prix as well as defending his national title.

References

External links

1990 births
Living people
Finnish speedway riders
Leicester Lions riders
Ipswich Witches riders